Jennifer Susan Pitman OBE (née Harvey, born 11 June 1946) is a British former racehorse trainer and author. She became the first woman to train a Grand National winner, when Corbiere won the race in 1983. She went on to win a second Grand National with Royal Athlete in 1995. She has also trained two Cheltenham Gold Cup winners with Burrough Hill Lad in 1984 and with Garrison Savanah in 1991.  Following her retirement from horse training in 1998 she became a writer of novels, principally with a racing theme. She is a member of the Disciplinary Panel and Licensing Committee of the British Horseracing Authority.

Childhood
Pitman grew up on her family's farm near Hoby, Leicestershire, one of seven children. She was brought up assisting in manual farm work, where horse powered equipment was a novelty, and learned to ride a pony "so young that being on horseback seemed as natural as walking". In 1957 she left the Hoby village school to attend Sarson Secondary Modern Girls' School in Melton Mowbray. She sustained a fractured skull when a showjumping pole fell on her head during a gymkhana at Syston, it was many months before resultant convulsions were diagnosed. At the age of 14, she obtained a weekend and school holiday job at Brooksby Grange horse racing yard.

Pitman left school two weeks before her 15th birthday, taking up a position as a stable girl at Brooksby Grange for a weekly wage of £3 4s 5d. Her first overnight stop was at Manchester where her filly, Star Princess, won the 1962 Diomedes Handicap. Two years later she changed jobs, moving to a stable in Bishop's Cleeve, Gloucestershire, the first time she had lived away from her Leicestershire home.

Adult life
Pitman worked at Bishop's Cleeve for two years. One day there, she was returning from a workout on the local gallops when her horse was spooked by a cyclist travelling around a corner too fast and on the wrong side of the road. The cyclist in question was jockey Richard Pitman. Jenny's initial reaction to Richard was unfavourable, but later, when Richard obtained a job in Lambourn at Fred Winter's training stables  from Bishop's Cleeve, Jenny was persuaded to apply for a job in Lambourn with Major Champneys at Church Farm Stables. She moved in 1964.

Aged 19, she married Richard Pitman. In August 1966, their son Mark Pitman was born and Jenny became a full-time housewife. Son Paul was born in October 1967. In the next winter, missing the world of horses, they bought a  property with stables and an indoor school in Hinton Parva to provide a service to other trainers for recuperating injured horses. In 'Parva Stud', the family struggled to live in an unheated caravan. By the end of 1968 Pitman had 8 horses at the yard. With Richard's second place prize from the 1969 Grand National, the Pitmans were able to commission a bungalow on the premises to escape the poor condition caravan. In 1969 she employed a 'lad' to assist at the yard, Melvyn Saddler, who became her right-hand man as her success grew.

In February 1974, Pitman was able to enter a horse she had trained in her first point-to-point race. Ridden by stable lad Bryan Smart, Road Race didn't figure in the race betting, but amazingly managed to pass the favourite after the last fence to win.

In 1975 she was successful in getting her first horse training licence and her first winner came in the very same year.

In 1977 Jenny and Richard divorced. Jenny left Wiltshire and moved to Lambourn, Berkshire. She is now married to businessman David Stait.

In 1983 she became the first woman to train a Grand National winner, when Corbiere was the victor. She was to win one other Grand National with Royal Athlete in 1995 although her horse Esha Ness was first past the post in the void National of 1993.
 
In 1998 she was awarded the OBE for services to horseracing and subsequently retired from training racehorses in 1999, handing over the reins to son, Mark. Pitman was the first winner of the BBC Sports Personality of the Year Helen Rollason Award.

Although still seen at the races, she is now a prolific writer of novels, principally with a racing spin. Pitman is a survivor of thyroid cancer and a patron of the British Thyroid Foundation. In 2017 she became a member of the Disciplinary Panel and Licensing Committee of the British Horseracing Authority

Books

 co-author Sue Gibson

References

External links
Grand National World

1946 births
21st-century British novelists
Living people
British racehorse trainers
Officers of the Order of the British Empire
People from Lambourn
People from the Borough of Melton
Sportspeople from Leicestershire
People from Wiltshire